The Neufeld-Occhipinti Jazz Orchestra (NOJO) is a Canadian jazz musical group based in Toronto, Ontario, Canada.  In 2016, it had sixteen members. The group performs mainly music created and arranged by its members. Their present label is True North Records.

History
The Neufeld-Occhipinti Jazz Orchestra was formed in 1994 by Michael Occhipinti and pianist Paul Neufeld.  In 1995 the orchestra's first album was produced, and it won a Juno award for Best Contemporary Jazz Album.

In 1998 NOJO release the album You are Here, which was re-released in 2000.

In 2002 the band formed a smaller nine piece core group for touring.

NOJO has performed at  the Umbria Jazz Winter Festival in Orvieto, Italy, The Jazz Standard in New York, and Montreal’s Festival International de Jazz.

In 2004 the group released the album City of Neighbourhoods, with Sam Rivers, on True North Records. The album received distribution in the United States through Rounder Records. IN 2005 they performed at the Toronto Downtown Jazz Festival 

The group has released five recordings of original music, each of which has been nominated for a Juno award.

In 2010 the orchestra released NOJO Explores the Dark Side of the Moon, which features the band performing original arrangements of Pink Floyd’s classic album.

NOJO has been positively reviewed by Don Heckman, Los Angeles Times, Larry Applebaum, JazzTimes, Frank Rubalino Cadence, Rinus van der Hayden, Brabants Dagblad, Netherlands, and Kerry Doole, The Jazz Report.

A number of well-known musicians have been guest performers with the orchestra, including saxophonist Joe Lovano, trombonist Ray Anderson, trumpeter Kenny Wheeler, clarinetist Don Byron and the late saxophonist Sam Rivers, who both recorded and toured with the ensemble.

Awards and recognition 
1996: winner of Juno Award, Best Contemporary Jazz Album, NOJO
1997: nomination for Juno Award, Best Contemporary Jazz Album, FireWater
1999: nomination for Juno Award, Best Contemporary Jazz Album, You Are Here (with Don Byron)
2003: nomination for Juno Award, Contemporary Jazz Album of the Year, Highwire
2005: nomination for Juno Award, Contemporary Jazz Album of the Year, City of Neighbourhoods (with Sam Rivers)

Discography 
1995: NOJO (Au)
1996: FireWater (Au)
1998: You Are Here with Don Byron (True North)
2002: Highwire with Don Byron and Hugh Marsh (True North)
2004: City of Neighbourhoods with Sam Rivers (True North)
2010: Explores the Dark Side of the Moon (True North)

References

External links 
 Official website

Arts organizations established in 1994
Musical groups established in 1994
Musical groups from Toronto
Canadian jazz ensembles
Juno Award for Contemporary Jazz Album of the Year winners
1994 establishments in Ontario